Chun Mi-kyung (born 17 February 1973) is a South Korean fencer. She competed in the women's foil events at the 1992 and 1996 Summer Olympics.

References

1973 births
Living people
South Korean female fencers
Olympic fencers of South Korea
Fencers at the 1992 Summer Olympics
Fencers at the 1996 Summer Olympics
Asian Games medalists in fencing
Fencers at the 1994 Asian Games
Fencers at the 1998 Asian Games
Asian Games gold medalists for South Korea
Asian Games bronze medalists for South Korea
Medalists at the 1994 Asian Games
Medalists at the 1998 Asian Games
20th-century South Korean women